Mono Mills may refer to:
Mono Mills, Ontario, Canada
Mono Mills, California, United States